Middle Eastern Cold War may refer to:
The 21st century Iran–Saudi Arabia proxy conflict, sometimes called the Middle East Cold War
The 1952–1991 Arab Cold War, new republics led by Gamal Abdel Nasser of Egypt and traditionalist kingdoms, led by King Faisal of Saudi Arabia
Cold War in the Middle East, the regional aspect of the global Cold War, 1947-1991
The 21st century Iran–Israel proxy conflict, sometimes called the Iran–Israel Cold War
The 21st century Qatar–Saudi Arabia diplomatic conflict, between Qatar and Saudi Arabia and is sometimes referred to as the Second Arab Cold War